Jamaica competed at the 13th Pan American Games, which were held in Winnipeg, Manitoba, Canada from July 23 to August 8, 1999.

Medals

Gold

Men's 400 metres: Greg Haughton
Men's 4x400 metres: Davian Clarke, Michael McDonald, Danny McFarlane and Greg Haughton
Women's 4x100 metres: Peta-Gaye Gayle, Beverly Grant, Kerry Ann Richards, and Aleen Bailey

Silver

Women's Triple Jump: Suzette Lee

Women's 200m freestyle: Janelle Atkinson
Women's 400m freestyle: Janelle Atkinson
Women's 800m freestyle: Janelle Atkinson

Bronze

Men's 4x100 metres: Patrick Jarrett, Dwight Thomas, Garth Robinson, and Christopher Williams
Women's 100 metres: Peta-Gaye Gayle
Women's 400 metres: Claudine Williams

Men's Light Middleweight (– 71 kilograms): David Sean Black
Men's Heavyweight (– 91 kilograms): Kerron Speid

Results by event

See also
Jamaica at the 1998 Commonwealth Games
Jamaica at the 2000 Summer Olympics

Nations at the 1999 Pan American Games
P
1999